Bob Keddie (born 19 July 1945) is a former Scotland international rugby union player.

Rugby Union career

Amateur career

He played club rugby for Watsonians.

He went on to play for London Scottish.

Provincial career

He played for Edinburgh District in the Scottish Inter-District Championship.

International career

He was capped once for Scotland. He played against the All Blacks on 2 December 1967 at Murrayfield.

He had to withdraw from the Scotland squad in 1968 due to a knee injury.

References

1945 births
Living people
Scottish rugby union players
Scotland international rugby union players
Edinburgh District (rugby union) players
Watsonians RFC players
Rugby union players from Edinburgh
Rugby union centres